Murphy Lake is a lake in Lincoln County, Montana, United States, within Kootenai National Forest, northwest of Dickey Lake. Murphy Lake lies at an elevation of 2999 feet (914 m). A ranger station and a campground are located on the lake's shore.

References

Murphy Lake visitor information

Lakes of Montana
Bodies of water of Lincoln County, Montana
Kootenai National Forest
Protected areas of Lincoln County, Montana